Henry Charles Eitzen Building, also known as the Oscar H. Guether Store Building and Hy. Poppenheusen Tin Shop, is a historic commercial building located at Washington, Franklin County, Missouri. The original section was built about 1854, and is a 2 1/2-story, German Neoclassical style brick building in the Klassisismus form.  It has a three-bay, one-story brick ell added before 1893.

It was listed on the National Register of Historic Places in 2000.

References

Commercial buildings on the National Register of Historic Places in Missouri
Neoclassical architecture in Missouri
Commercial buildings completed in 1854
Buildings and structures in Franklin County, Missouri
National Register of Historic Places in Franklin County, Missouri
1854 establishments in Missouri